Vivien Folláth is a Hungarian sprint canoer and marathon canoeist who has competed since the mid-2000s. She won a gold medal in the K-1 5000 m event at the 2010 ICF Canoe Sprint World Championships in Poznań.

References
2010 ICF Canoe Sprint World Championships women's K-1 5000 m results. - accessed 21 August 2010.
Hungarianambience.com profile of Folláth's K-1 5000 m victory. - accessed 24 August 2010.

Hungarian female canoeists
Living people
Year of birth missing (living people)
ICF Canoe Sprint World Championships medalists in kayak